The Combat Medical Badge is an award of the United States Army which was first created in January 1945. Any member of the Army Medical Department, at the rank of colonel or below, who is assigned or attached to a ground combat arms unit of brigade or smaller size which provides medical support during any period in which the unit was engaged in  ground combat is eligible for the CMB. According to the award criterion, the individual must be performing medical duties while simultaneously being engaged by the enemy; strict adherence to this requirement and its interpretation (e.g., distant mortar rounds vs. direct small arms fire) will vary by unit. As of 3 June 2005, Special Forces medics are no longer eligible for award, but may now receive the Combat Infantryman Badge. A revision has allowed aviation medics to be eligible for the CMB.  The non-combat proficiency equivalent is the Expert Field Medical Badge.

Appearance
The Combat Medical Badge is one inch tall and one and a half inches wide.

History
The Combat Medical Badge is retroactive to 6 December 1941. The original decoration was considered a one-time decoration, however this directive was rescinded in 1951 allowing for multiple awards of the Combat Medical Badge denoted by stars encircling the decoration. According to the US Army Medical Department Regiment, to date there have been only two soldiers that have earned the Combat Medical Badge with two stars: Henry Jenkins and Wayne Slagel. The directive was again altered in 1969 to specify that only one award of the Combat Medical Badge is authorized for service in the Vietnam Conflict Era, which included service in Vietnam and Laos, the Dominican Republic, and South Korea (subsequent to 4 January 1969). Current regulations have expanded this qualifying period to include service in El Salvador, Grenada, Panama, Southwest Asia, and Somalia, and have added an additional qualifying period (the Global War on Terror Era) covering service in Iraq and Afghanistan.

In 1947, a policy was implemented that authorized the retroactive award of the Bronze Star to soldiers who had received the Combat Medical badge during the Second World War. The basis for doing this was that the Combat Medical Badge was awarded only to soldiers who had borne combat duties befitting the Bronze Star Medal and also that both awards required a recommendation by the commander and a citation in orders.

The CMB is authorized for award for the following qualifying
periods:

World War II Era
1. World War II (7 December 1941 to 3 September 1945).

Korean War Era
2. The Korean War (27 June 1950 to 27 July 1953).

Vietnam War Era
3. Republic of Vietnam Conflict (2 March 1961 to 28 March 1973), combined with qualifying service in Laos (19 April 1961 to 6 October 1962).
4. Dominican Republic (28 April 1965 to 1 September 1966).
5. Korea on the DMZ (4 January 1969 to 31 March 1994).
6. El Salvador (1 January 1981 to 1 February 1992).
7. Grenada (23 October to 21 November 1983).
8. Joint Security Area, Panmunjom, Korea (23 November 1984).
9. Panama (20 December 1989 to 31 January 1990).
10. Southwest Asia Conflict (17 January to 11 April 1991).
11. Somalia (5 June 1992 to 31 March 1994).

Global War on Terror Era
12. Afghanistan (Operations Enduring Freedom - Afghanistan and Freedom's Sentinel, 5 December 2001 to 30 August 2021).
13. Iraq (Operations Iraqi Freedom and New Dawn, 19 March 2003 to 31 December 2011).

The first female medic to be awarded the CMB was Specialist Erica Marie Galo in Fallujah Iraq in December 2003. (This is incorrect.  The first woman awarded the CMB was PFC Claudia Kannel, Task Force 2-3 Field Artillery, on 15 October 2003 in Baghdad, Iraq.  1st Armored Division and Task Force Iron requested a change in regulations regarding the Award of the CMB in September, and it was approved in October after approval by the Department of the Army G1.)
As of 2005 the rules for eligibility were changed to allow any medical department soldier in a brigade or lower unit to be eligible so long as they are engaged in actual ground combat and performed medical duties. This now includes Soldiers assigned to aviation units. Additionally, in 2008, IED/VBIEDs can now be considered direct contact with the enemy. 

As of June 2011, the badge and its sew-on equivalent may be worn on the Army Combat Uniform (ACU).

See also
 Military badges of the United States

References

External links
  578.70  Combat Medical Badge
 Army Times: New combat badge rules

Military medicine in the United States
United States military badges
+